The 1947 Liverpool Edge Hill by-election was a parliamentary by-election held in England to elect a new Member of Parliament (MP) for the British House of Commons constituency of Liverpool Edge Hill on 11 September 1947. The seat became vacant on the death of the constituency's Labour Member of Parliament (MP) Richard Clitherow.

The result was a hold for the Labour Party.

Result

See also
 Liverpool Edge Hill (UK Parliament constituency)
 1979 Liverpool Edge Hill by-election
 List of United Kingdom by-elections
 List of parliamentary constituencies in Merseyside

References

1947 elections in the United Kingdom
1947 in England
Edge Hill By-Election, 1947
Edge Hill, 1947
September 1947 events in the United Kingdom